Tradewind Books is a small Canadian publisher of children’s literature located in Vancouver, British Columbia. The company was founded in 1996 by Michael Katz and Carol Frank, and their titles have since been internationally recognized for their illustrations, writing, and design. They release six to eight publications each year, including picture books, poetry books, chapter books, and young adult novels.

History and Mandate
Founded by Michael Katz and Carol Frank in 1996, Tradewind Books has over 100 titles in print. Their current office is located on Granville Island.

Tradewind Books is committed to promoting multiculturalism in Canada, and frequently publishes books showcasing worldwide points of view. Their books span ethnicities and locations throughout North America, such as Canadian aboriginals and Chinese Americans, and around the world, including Egypt, Mexico and the Caribbean. Their titles have been translated into French, German, Portuguese, and Korean.

Distribution
Tradewind Books is distributed by Fitzhenry & Whiteside in Canada, Orca Books in the US, Turnaround Publisher Services in the UK, and John Reed Books in Australia. Tradewind has also sold co-edition and translation rights to publishers in various countries, including the US, Mexico, Korea and Portugal.

Awards and recognition
Books and authors published by Tradewind Books have been recognized and awarded around the world. Black Dog Dream Dog, written by Michele Superle and illustrated by Millie Ballance, and Honey Cake, written by Joan Betty Stuchner and illustrated by Cynthia Nugent, both won the Chocolate Lily Award. Another book illustrated by Millie Ballance, The Eco Diary of Kiran Singer, written by Sue Ann Alderson, won the Henry Bergh Children's Book Award (2007). The King Has Goat Ears, written by Katarina Jovanovic and illustrated by Philippe Béha, won the Christie Harris Illustrated Children's Literature Prize (2009 BC Book Prizes). Abby's Birds, written by Ellen Schwartz and illustrated by Sima Elizabeth Shefrin, won the Elizabeth-Mrazik Cleaver Award for Illustration (2007).

In 2012, Paul Yee, author of eight titles for Tradewind, was awarded the Vicky Metcalf Award for Children's Literature by the Writers' Trust of Canada for his lifetime achievement.

References

External links
Official Site

Book publishing companies of Canada
Companies based in Vancouver